Indium (49In) consists of two primordial nuclides, with the most common (~ 95.7%) nuclide (115In) being measurably though weakly radioactive. Its spin-forbidden decay has a half life of 4.41×1014 years.

The stable isotope 113In is only 4.3% of naturally occurring indium. Among elements with a known stable isotope, only tellurium and rhenium similarly occur with a stable isotope in lower abundance than the long-lived radioactive isotope. Other than 115In, the longest-lived radioisotope is 111In, with a half-life of 2.8047 days. All other radioisotopes have half-lives less than a day. This element also has 47 isomers, the longest-lived being 114m1In, with a half-life of 49.51 days. All other meta-states have half-lives less than a day, most less than an hour, and many measured in milliseconds or less.

Indium-111 is used medically in nuclear imaging, as a radiotracer nuclide tag for gamma camera localization of protein radiopharmaceuticals, such as In-111-labeled octreotide, which binds to receptors on certain endocrine tumors (Octreoscan). Indium-111 is also used in indium white blood cell scans, which use nuclear medical techniques to search for hidden infections.

List of isotopes 

|-
| 97In
| style="text-align:right" | 49
| style="text-align:right" | 48
| 96.94954(64)#
| 5# ms
|
|
| 9/2+#
|
|
|-
| 98In
| style="text-align:right" | 49
| style="text-align:right" | 49
| 97.94214(21)#
| 45(23) ms[32(+32−11) ms]
| β+
| 98Cd
| 0+#
|
|
|-
| style="text-indent:1em" | 98mIn
| colspan="3" style="text-indent:2em" | 0(500)# keV
| 1.7(8) s[1.2(+12−4) s]
|
|
|
|
|
|-
| 99In
| style="text-align:right" | 49
| style="text-align:right" | 50
| 98.93422(43)#
| 3.1(8) s[3.0(+8-7) s]
| β+
| 99Cd
| 9/2+#
|
|
|-
| style="text-indent:1em" | 99mIn
| colspan="3" style="text-indent:2em" | 400(150)# keV
| 1# s
|
|
| 1/2−#
|
|
|-
| rowspan=2|100In
| rowspan=2 style="text-align:right" | 49
| rowspan=2 style="text-align:right" | 51
| rowspan=2|99.93111(27)
| rowspan=2|5.9(2) s
| β+ (96.1%)
| 100Cd
| rowspan=2|(6, 7)+
| rowspan=2|
| rowspan=2|
|-
| β+, p (3.9%)
| 99Ag
|-
| rowspan=2|101In
| rowspan=2 style="text-align:right" | 49
| rowspan=2 style="text-align:right" | 52
| rowspan=2|100.92634(32)#
| rowspan=2|15.1(3) s
| β+
| 101Cd
| rowspan=2|9/2+#
| rowspan=2|
| rowspan=2|
|-
| β+, p
| 100Ag
|-
| style="text-indent:1em" | 101mIn
| colspan="3" style="text-indent:2em" | 550(100)# keV
| 10# s
|
|
| 1/2−#
|
|
|-
| rowspan=2|102In
| rowspan=2 style="text-align:right" | 49
| rowspan=2 style="text-align:right" | 53
| rowspan=2|101.92409(12)
| rowspan=2|23.3(1) s
| β+ (99.99%)
| 102Cd
| rowspan=2|(6+)
| rowspan=2|
| rowspan=2|
|-
| β+, p (.00929%)
| 101Ag
|-
| 103In
| style="text-align:right" | 49
| style="text-align:right" | 54
| 102.919914(27)
| 60(1) s
| β+
| 103Cd
| 9/2+#
|
|
|-
| style="text-indent:1em" | 103mIn
| colspan="3" style="text-indent:2em" | 631.7(1) keV
| 34(2) s
|
|
| (1/2−)#
|
|
|-
| 104In
| style="text-align:right" | 49
| style="text-align:right" | 55
| 103.91830(9)
| 1.80(3) min
| β+
| 104Cd
| 5, 6(+)
|
|
|-
| rowspan=2 style="text-indent:1em" | 104mIn
| rowspan=2 colspan="3" style="text-indent:2em" | 93.48(10) keV
| rowspan=2|15.7(5) s
| IT (80%)
| 104In
| rowspan=2|(3+)
| rowspan=2|
| rowspan=2|
|-
| β+ (20%)
| 104Cd
|-
| 105In
| style="text-align:right" | 49
| style="text-align:right" | 56
| 104.914674(19)
| 5.07(7) min
| β+
| 105Cd
| 9/2+
|
|
|-
| style="text-indent:1em" | 105mIn
| colspan="3" style="text-indent:2em" | 674.1(3) keV
| 48(6) s
| IT
| 105In
| (1/2)−
|
|
|-
| 106In
| style="text-align:right" | 49
| style="text-align:right" | 57
| 105.913465(13)
| 6.2(1) min
| β+
| 106Cd
| 7+
|
|
|-
| style="text-indent:1em" | 106mIn
| colspan="3" style="text-indent:2em" | 28.6(3) keV
| 5.2(1) min
| β+
| 106Cd
| (3+)
|
|
|-
| 107In
| style="text-align:right" | 49
| style="text-align:right" | 58
| 106.910295(12)
| 32.4(3) min
| β+
| 107Cd
| 9/2+
|
|
|-
| style="text-indent:1em" | 107mIn
| colspan="3" style="text-indent:2em" | 678.5(3) keV
| 50.4(6) s
| IT
| 107In
| 1/2−
|
|
|-
| 108In
| style="text-align:right" | 49
| style="text-align:right" | 59
| 107.909698(10)
| 58.0(12) min
| β+
| 108Cd
| 7+
|
|
|-
| style="text-indent:1em" | 108mIn
| colspan="3" style="text-indent:2em" | 29.75(5) keV
| 39.6(7) min
| β+
| 108Cd
| 2+
|
|
|-
| 109In
| style="text-align:right" | 49
| style="text-align:right" | 60
| 108.907151(6)
| 4.2(1) h
| β+
| 109Cd
| 9/2+
|
|
|-
| style="text-indent:1em" | 109m1In
| colspan="3" style="text-indent:2em" | 650.1(3) keV
| 1.34(7) min
| IT
| 109In
| 1/2−
|
|
|-
| style="text-indent:1em" | 109m2In
| colspan="3" style="text-indent:2em" | 2101.8(2) keV
| 209(6) ms
|
|
| (19/2+)
|
|
|-
| 110In
| style="text-align:right" | 49
| style="text-align:right" | 61
| 109.907165(13)
| 4.9(1) h
| β+
| 110Cd
| 7+
|
|
|-
| style="text-indent:1em" | 110mIn
| colspan="3" style="text-indent:2em" | 62.1(5) keV
| 69.1(5) min
| β+
| 110Cd
| 2+
|
|
|-
| 111In
| style="text-align:right" | 49
| style="text-align:right" | 62
| 110.905103(5)
| 2.8047(5) d
| EC
| 111Cd
| 9/2+
|
|
|-
| style="text-indent:1em" | 111mIn
| colspan="3" style="text-indent:2em" | 536.95(6) keV
| 7.7(2) min
| IT
| 111In
| 1/2−
|
|
|-
| rowspan=2|112In
| rowspan=2 style="text-align:right" | 49
| rowspan=2 style="text-align:right" | 63
| rowspan=2|111.905532(6)
| rowspan=2|14.97(10) min
| β+ (56%)
| 112Cd
| rowspan=2|1+
| rowspan=2|
| rowspan=2|
|-
| β− (44%)
| 112Sn
|-
| style="text-indent:1em" | 112m1In
| colspan="3" style="text-indent:2em" | 156.59(5) keV
| 20.56(6) min
| β+
| 112Cd
| 4+
|
|
|-
| style="text-indent:1em" | 112m2In
| colspan="3" style="text-indent:2em" | 350.76(9) keV
| 690(50) ns
|
|
| 7+
|
|
|-
| style="text-indent:1em" | 112m3In
| colspan="3" style="text-indent:2em" | 613.69(14) keV
| 2.81(3) μs
|
|
| 8-
|
|
|-
| 113In
| style="text-align:right" | 49
| style="text-align:right" | 64
| 112.904058(3)
| colspan=3 align=center|Stable
| 9/2+
| 0.0429(5)
|
|-
| style="text-indent:1em" | 113mIn
| colspan="3" style="text-indent:2em" | 391.699(3) keV
| 1.6579(4) h
| IT
| 113In
| 1/2−
|
|
|-
| rowspan=2|114In
| rowspan=2 style="text-align:right" | 49
| rowspan=2 style="text-align:right" | 65
| rowspan=2|113.904914(3)
| rowspan=2|71.9(1) s
| β+ (0.5%)
| 114Cd
| rowspan=2|1+
| rowspan=2|
| rowspan=2|
|-
| β− (99.5%)
| 114Sn
|-
| rowspan=2 style="text-indent:1em" | 114m1In
| rowspan=2 colspan="3" style="text-indent:2em" | 190.29(3) keV
| rowspan=2|49.51(1) d
| IT (96.75%)
| 114In
| rowspan=2|5+
| rowspan=2|
| rowspan=2|
|-
| β+ (3.25%)
| 114Cd
|-
| rowspan=2 style="text-indent:1em" | 114m2In
| rowspan=2 colspan="3" style="text-indent:2em" | 501.94(3) keV
| rowspan=2|43.1(6) ms
| IT (96.75%)
| 114In
| rowspan=2|(8−)
| rowspan=2|
| rowspan=2|
|-
| β+ (3.25%)
| 114Cd
|-
| style="text-indent:1em" | 114m3In
| colspan="3" style="text-indent:2em" | 641.72(3) keV
| 4.3(4) μs
|
|
| (7+)
|
|
|-
| 115In
| style="text-align:right" | 49
| style="text-align:right" | 66
| 114.903878(5)
| 4.41(25)×1014 a
| β−
| 115Sn
| 9/2+
| 0.9571(5)
|
|-
| rowspan=2 style="text-indent:1em" | 115mIn
| rowspan=2 colspan="3" style="text-indent:2em" | 336.244(17) keV
| rowspan=2|4.486(4) h
| IT (95%)
| 115In
| rowspan=2|1/2−
| rowspan=2|
| rowspan=2|
|-
| β− (5%)
| 115Sn
|-
| rowspan=2|116In
| rowspan=2 style="text-align:right" | 49
| rowspan=2 style="text-align:right" | 67
| rowspan=2|115.905260(5)
| rowspan=2|14.10(3) s
| β− (99.98%)
| 116Sn
| rowspan=2|1+
| rowspan=2|
| rowspan=2|
|-
| EC (0.02%)
| 116Cd
|-
| style="text-indent:1em" | 116m1In
| colspan="3" style="text-indent:2em" | 127.267(6) keV
| 54.29(17) min
|
|
| 5+
|
|
|-
| style="text-indent:1em" | 116m2In
| colspan="3" style="text-indent:2em" | 289.660(6) keV
| 2.18(4) s
|
|
| 8-
|
|
|-
| 117In
| style="text-align:right" | 49
| style="text-align:right" | 68
| 116.904514(6)
| 43.2(3) min
| β−
| 117Sn
| 9/2+
|
|
|-
| rowspan=2 style="text-indent:1em" | 117mIn
| rowspan=2 colspan="3" style="text-indent:2em" | 315.302(12) keV
| rowspan=2|116.2(3) min
| β− (52.91%)
| 117Sn
| rowspan=2|1/2−
| rowspan=2|
| rowspan=2|
|-
| IT (47.09%)
| 117In
|-
| 118In
| style="text-align:right" | 49
| style="text-align:right" | 69
| 117.906354(9)
| 5.0(5) s
| β−
| 118Sn
| 1+
|
|
|-
| style="text-indent:1em" | 118m1In
| colspan="3" style="text-indent:2em" | 100(50)# keV
| 4.364(7) min
| β−
| 118Sn
| 5+
|
|
|-
| style="text-indent:1em" | 118m2In
| colspan="3" style="text-indent:2em" | 240(50)# keV
| 8.5(3) s
|
|
| 8-
|
|
|-
| 119In
| style="text-align:right" | 49
| style="text-align:right" | 70
| 118.905845(8)
| 2.4(1) min
| β−
| 119Sn
| 9/2+
|
|
|-
| rowspan=2 style="text-indent:1em" | 119m1In
| rowspan=2 colspan="3" style="text-indent:2em" | 311.37(3) keV
| rowspan=2|18.0(3) min
| β− (94.4%)
| 119Sn
| rowspan=2|1/2−
| rowspan=2|
| rowspan=2|
|-
| IT (5.6%)
| 119In
|-
| style="text-indent:1em" | 119m2In
| colspan="3" style="text-indent:2em" | 654.27(7) keV
| 130(15) ns
|
|
| 1/2+, 3/2+
|
|
|-
| 120In
| style="text-align:right" | 49
| style="text-align:right" | 71
| 119.90796(4)
| 3.08(8) s
| β−
| 120Sn
| 1+
|
|
|-
| style="text-indent:1em" | 120m1In
| colspan="3" style="text-indent:2em" | 50(60)# keV
| 46.2(8) s
|
|
| 5+
|
|
|-
| style="text-indent:1em" | 120m2In
| colspan="3" style="text-indent:2em" | 300(200)# keV
| 47.3(5) s
| β−
| 120Sn
| 8(−)
|
|
|-
| 121In
| style="text-align:right" | 49
| style="text-align:right" | 72
| 120.907846(29)
| 23.1(6) s
| β−
| 121Sn
| 9/2+
|
|
|-
| rowspan=2 style="text-indent:1em" | 121mIn
| rowspan=2 colspan="3" style="text-indent:2em" | 312.98(8) keV
| rowspan=2|3.88(10) min
| β− (98.8%)
| 121Sn
| rowspan=2|1/2−
| rowspan=2|
| rowspan=2|
|-
| IT (1.2%)
| 121In
|-
| 122In
| style="text-align:right" | 49
| style="text-align:right" | 73
| 121.91028(5)
| 1.5(3) s
| β−
| 122Sn
| 1+
|
|
|-
| style="text-indent:1em" | 122m1In
| colspan="3" style="text-indent:2em" | 40(60)# keV
| 10.3(6) s
|
|
| 5+
|
|
|-
| style="text-indent:1em" | 122m2In
| colspan="3" style="text-indent:2em" | 290(140) keV
| 10.8(4) s
| β−
| 122Sn
| 8-
|
|
|-
| 123In
| style="text-align:right" | 49
| style="text-align:right" | 74
| 122.910438(26)
| 6.17(5) s
| β−
| 123mSn
| (9/2)+
|
|
|-
| style="text-indent:1em" | 123mIn
| colspan="3" style="text-indent:2em" | 327.21(4) keV
| 47.4(4) s
| β−
| 123mSn
| (1/2)−
|
|
|-
| 124In
| style="text-align:right" | 49
| style="text-align:right" | 75
| 123.91318(5)
| 3.11(10) s
| β−
| 124Sn
| 3+
| 
| 
|-
| rowspan=2 style="text-indent:1em" | 124mIn
| rowspan=2 colspan="3" style="text-indent:2em" | −20(70) keV
| rowspan=2|3.7(2) s
| β−
| 124Sn
| rowspan=2|(8)(−#)
| rowspan=2|
| rowspan=2|
|-
| IT
| 124In
|-
| 125In
| style="text-align:right" | 49
| style="text-align:right" | 76
| 124.91360(3)
| 2.36(4) s
| β−
| 125mSn
| 9/2+
|
|
|-
| style="text-indent:1em" | 125mIn
| colspan="3" style="text-indent:2em" | 360.12(9) keV
| 12.2(2) s
| β−
| 125Sn
| 1/2(−)
|
|
|-
| 126In
| style="text-align:right" | 49
| style="text-align:right" | 77
| 125.91646(4)
| 1.53(1) s
| β−
| 126Sn
| 3(+#)
|
|
|-
| style="text-indent:1em" | 126mIn
| colspan="3" style="text-indent:2em" | 100(60) keV
| 1.64(5) s
| β−
| 126Sn
| 8(−#)
|
|
|-
| rowspan=2|127In
| rowspan=2 style="text-align:right" | 49
| rowspan=2 style="text-align:right" | 78
| rowspan=2|126.91735(4)
| rowspan=2|1.09(1) s
| β− (99.97%)
| 127mSn
| rowspan=2|9/2(+)
| rowspan=2|
| rowspan=2|
|-
| β−, n (.03%)
| 126Sn
|-
| rowspan=2 style="text-indent:1em" | 127mIn
| rowspan=2 colspan="3" style="text-indent:2em" | 460(70) keV
| rowspan=2|3.67(4) s
| β− (99.31%)
| 127mSn
| rowspan=2|(1/2−)
| rowspan=2|
| rowspan=2|
|-
| β−, n (.69%)
| 126Sn
|-
| rowspan=2|128In
| rowspan=2 style="text-align:right" | 49
| rowspan=2 style="text-align:right" | 79
| rowspan=2|127.92017(5)
| rowspan=2|0.84(6) s
| β− (99.96%)
| 128Sn
| rowspan=2|(3)+
| rowspan=2|
| rowspan=2|
|-
| β−, n (.038%)
| 127Sn
|-
| style="text-indent:1em" | 128m1In
| colspan="3" style="text-indent:2em" | 247.87(10) keV
| 10(7) ms
|
|
| (1)−
|
|
|-
| style="text-indent:1em" | 128m2In
| colspan="3" style="text-indent:2em" | 320(60) keV
| 720(100) ms
| β−
| 128Sn
| (8−)
|
|
|-
| rowspan=2|129In
| rowspan=2 style="text-align:right" | 49
| rowspan=2 style="text-align:right" | 80
| rowspan=2|128.92170(5)
| rowspan=2|611(4) ms
| β− (99.75%)
| 129Sn
| rowspan=2|9/2+#
| rowspan=2|
| rowspan=2|
|-
| β−, n (.25%)
| 128Sn
|-
| rowspan=3 style="text-indent:1em" | 129m1In
| rowspan=3 colspan="3" style="text-indent:2em" | 380(70) keV
| rowspan=3|1.23(3) s
| β− (97.2%)
| 129Sn
| rowspan=3|(1/2−)#
| rowspan=3|
| rowspan=3|
|-
| β−, n (2.5%)
| 128Sn
|-
| IT (.3%)
| 129In
|-
| style="text-indent:1em" | 129m2In
| colspan="3" style="text-indent:2em" | 1688.0(5) keV
| 8.5(5) μs
|
|
| 17/2−
|
|
|-
| rowspan=2|130In
| rowspan=2 style="text-align:right" | 49
| rowspan=2 style="text-align:right" | 81
| rowspan=2|129.92497(4)
| rowspan=2|0.29(2) s
| β− (98.35%)
| 130Sn
| rowspan=2|1(−)
| rowspan=2|
| rowspan=2|
|-
| β−, n (1.65%)
| 129Sn
|-
| style="text-indent:1em" | 130m1In
| colspan="3" style="text-indent:2em" | 50(50) keV
| 538(5) ms
|
|
| 10-#
| 
| 
|-
| style="text-indent:1em" | 130m2In
| colspan="3" style="text-indent:2em" | 400(60) keV
| 0.54(1) s
|
|
| (5+)
|
|
|-
| rowspan=2|131In
| rowspan=2 style="text-align:right" | 49
| rowspan=2 style="text-align:right" | 82
| rowspan=2|130.92685(3)
| rowspan=2|0.28(3) s
| β− (97.8%)
| 131Sn
| rowspan=2|(9/2+)
| rowspan=2|
| rowspan=2|
|-
| β−, n (2.19%)
| 130Sn
|-
| style="text-indent:1em" | 131m1In
| colspan="3" style="text-indent:2em" | 363(37) keV
| 0.35(5) s
|
|
| (1/2−)
|
|
|-
| style="text-indent:1em" | 131m2In
| colspan="3" style="text-indent:2em" | 4.10(7) MeV
| 320(60) ms
|
|
| (19/2+ to 23/2+)
|
|
|-
| rowspan=2|132In
| rowspan=2 style="text-align:right" | 49
| rowspan=2 style="text-align:right" | 83
| rowspan=2|131.93299(7)
| rowspan=2|206(4) ms
| β− (94.8%)
| 132Sn
| rowspan=2|(7−)
| rowspan=2|
| rowspan=2|
|-
| β−, n (5.2%)
| 131Sn
|-
| rowspan=2|133In
| rowspan=2 style="text-align:right" | 49
| rowspan=2 style="text-align:right" | 84
| rowspan=2|132.93781(32)#
| rowspan=2|165(3) ms
| β−, n (85%)
| 132Sn
| rowspan=2|(9/2+)
| rowspan=2|
| rowspan=2|
|-
| β− (15%)
| 133Sn
|-
| style="text-indent:1em" | 133mIn
| colspan="3" style="text-indent:2em" | 330(40)# keV
| 180# ms
| IT
| 133In
| (1/2−)
|
|
|-
| rowspan=3|134In
| rowspan=3 style="text-align:right" | 49
| rowspan=3 style="text-align:right" | 85
| rowspan=3|133.94415(43)#
| rowspan=3|140(4) ms
| β− (79%)
| 134Sn
| rowspan=3|
| rowspan=3|
| rowspan=3|
|-
| β−, n (17%)
| 133Sn
|-
| β−, 2n (4%)
| 132Sn
|-
| 135In
| style="text-align:right" | 49
| style="text-align:right" | 86
| 134.94933(54)#
| 92(10) ms
| β−
| 135Sn
| 9/2+#
|
|
|-
| 136In
| style="text-align:right" | 49
| style="text-align:right" | 87
|
| 85 ms
| β−
| 136Sn
|
|
|
|-
| 137In
| style="text-align:right" | 49
| style="text-align:right" | 88
|
| 65 ms
| β−
| 137Sn
|
|
|

References 

 Isotope masses from:

 Isotopic compositions and standard atomic masses from:

 Half-life, spin, and isomer data selected from the following sources.

 
Indium
Indium